Four Hearts  is a 1941 Soviet comedy film directed by Konstantin Yudin.

Plot 
In the suburban dacha settlement, a regiment of tankers has been quartered. The plot is built around two sisters, absolutely different, but equally loving. One is a serious mathematician, the other is a frivolous dragonfly. In the center of attention of the girls is a brave military man. Life vicissitudes, funny and difficult situations, intrigue, tears, joy, but everything is built around one love.

Cast
 Valentina Serova as Galina Sergeyevna Murashova
 Yevgeny Samoylov as First Lieutenant Pyotr Nikitich Kolchin
 Lyudmila Tselikovskaya as Alexandra Sergeyevna 'Shura' Murashova
 Pavel Shpringfeld as Gleb Zavartsev
 Lisa Dmitriyevskaya as Antonia Vasiliyevna Murasheva, mother  
 Irina Murzaeva as Tamara Spiridonovna, manicurist
 Andrey Tutyshkin as Prof. Arkadi Vassiliyevich Yershov
 Aleksandr Antonov as Colonel  
 Tatyana Barysheva as Zhurkevich, professor's aide
 Vsevolod Sanayev as Young soldier writing love letters
 Emmanuil Geller as Passenger
 Rostislav Plyatt as Examining professor
 Tatyana Govorkova as Station Master (uncredited)

Release 
In 1945, the film appeared on the screen and took the 5th place on the annual list of Soviet rental leaders with 19.44 million viewers.

References

External links 
 

1941 films
Soviet comedy films
1940s Russian-language films
1941 comedy films
Soviet black-and-white films
Mosfilm films